David Stach (born February 22, 1992) is a Czech ice hockey player who is currently playing for HSC Csíkszereda in the Erste Liga.

Stach has previously played in the Czech Extraliga for Piráti Chomutov, HC Kladno and HC Plzeň as well as in SM-liiga with Lukko.

References

External links

1992 births
Living people
Czech ice hockey left wingers
BK Havlíčkův Brod players
Rytíři Kladno players
Lukko players
Piráti Chomutov players
HC Plzeň players
SaPKo players
TuTo players
Czech expatriate ice hockey players in Finland
Sportspeople from Kladno